MRF Racing is an Indian racing team that competes in car racing and rallies.

Formula Racing
MRF built is first Formula 3 car in 1997. MRF in collaboration with Maruti established the Formula Maruti racing, a single-seater, open wheel class motorsport racing event for race cars made in India. MRF Challenge is an open-wheel motorsport formula based series organized by Madras Motor Sports Club in association with MRF. The latest season consisted of races organized at Madras Motor Racing Track, Chennai, Bahrain International Circuit, Losail International Circuit, Doha and Buddh International Circuit, Noida. MRF has sponsored Indian racing drivers including Narain Karthikeyan, Karun Chandok, Ashwin Sundar, N. Leelakrishnan and Raj Bharath.

Rallying
MRF have also been a long-running sponsor of MRF rally team participating in Asia-Pacific Rally Championship and Indian National Rally Championship. Associating with Czech car manufacturer Škoda, MRF Skoda is the three time reigning champion in Asia-Pacific Rally Championship with Chris Atkinson winning in 2012, Gaurav Gill in 2013 and Jan Kopecký in 2014. MRF also participates in Raid De Himalaya, the world's highest rally.

Others
MRF promotes a national motocross championship, a form of all-terrain two wheeler racing held on enclosed off-road circuits annually across several cities. MRF sponsors major karting championships in India. MRF is the first Indian tyre company to develop FIA approved karting tyres.

References

1997 establishments in India
Indian auto racing teams
Intercontinental Rally Challenge teams
MRF Challenge
European Rally Championship teams
Racecar constructors